Shigar River is located in the mountainous Baltistan region of northern Pakistan. The Shigar River is formed from the melted water of the Baltoro Glacier and Biafo Glacier. It flows through the Shigar Valley. The river is tributary to Indus River and meets the Indus in Skardu Valley.

References

External links

Tributaries of the Indus River
Baltistan
Rivers of Gilgit-Baltistan
Karakoram
Shigar District